Riverside International Raceway (sometimes known as Riverside, RIR, or Riverside Raceway) was a motorsports race track and road course established in the Edgemont area of Riverside County, California, just east of the city limits of Riverside and  east of Los Angeles, in 1957. In 1984, the raceway became part of the newly incorporated city of Moreno Valley. Riverside was noted for its hot, dusty environment and for being somewhat of a complicated and dangerous track for drivers. It was also considered one of the finest tracks in the United States. The track was in operation from September 22, 1957, to July 2, 1989, with the last race, The Budweiser 400, won by Rusty Wallace, held in 1988. After that final race, a shortened version of the circuit was kept open for car clubs and special events until 1989.

History

In the beginning it was originally called The Riverside International Motor Raceway. It was built in early 1957 by a company called West Coast Automotive Testing Corp.. The head of West Coast Auto Testing was a retired race driver named Rudy Cleye, from Los Angeles, who had previously raced in Europe. However, the building of the raceway was met with funding difficulties early on and businessman John Edgar provided a much needed cash investment. This late investment prevented any halt in the track's construction.

The first weekend of scheduled races in September 1957, a California Sports Car Club event, John Lawrence of Pasadena, California, died.  Lawrence, a former Cal Club member, piloting a 1500 cc Production champion, went off between Turns 5 and 6 . With no crash barrier in place, and no rollbar on the car, Lawrence's MGA went up the sand embankment, then rolled back onto the track.  Though Lawrence survived the incident, and appeared only slightly injured, he died later at the hospital of a brain injury.

The second major event at the track, in November 1957, was a sports car race featuring some of the top drivers of the day, including Carroll Shelby, Masten Gregory and Ken Miles. Another driver entered was an inexperienced local youngster named Dan Gurney, who had been offered the opportunity to drive a powerful but ill-handling 4.9-liter Ferrari after better-known drivers such as Shelby and Miles had rejected it. Shelby led early but spun and fell back. Gurney assumed the lead and led for much of the event. Shelby, driving furiously to catch up, finally overtook Gurney late in the race and won. Gurney's performance caught the eye of North American Ferrari importer Luigi Chinetti, who arranged for Gurney to drive a factory-supported Ferrari at Le Mans in 1958, effectively launching the Californian's European career.

Footage exists of classic races like the 1986 Los Angeles Times Grand Prix in which the Chevy Corvette of Doc Bundy, attempting a three-wide pass going into turn 1, hit the Ford Probe of Lyn St. James and the Jaguar of Chip Robinson. St. James' car caught fire and Chip Robinson nearly cartwheeled into the crowd. St. James survived the flames and Robinson escaped uninjured within the track bounds.

The track was known as a relatively dangerous course, with its long, downhill back straightaway and brake-destroying, relatively slow 180-degree Turn 9 at the end. During the 1965 Motor Trend 500 NASCAR race, Indycar great A. J. Foyt suffered a brake failure at the end of the straight, shot off the road and went end-over-end through the infield at high speed. Crash crews assumed Foyt was dead at the scene, until fellow driver Parnelli Jones noticed a twitch of movement. Ford factory sports car driver Ken Miles was killed there in a testing accident in August 1966 when his Ford sports car prototype (known as the J-car) became aerodynamically unstable and flew out of control at the end of the back straight. In December 1968, American Formula 5000 champion Dr. Lou Sell crashed and overturned in Turn 9 on the first lap of the Rex Mays 300 Indianapolis-style race, suffering near-fatal burns. In January 1967, Canadian driver Billy Foster crashed at Turn 9 during a practice-session just prior to the start of qualifying for the Motor Trend 500 NASCAR race. These accidents and others caused track management to reconfigure Turn 9, giving the turn a dogleg approach and a much wider radius (a water improvement also closed the raceway for a few months).

In January 1964, Riverside also claimed the life of 1962–'63 NASCAR champion Joe Weatherly, who refused to wear a shoulder harness and wore his lap belt loosely. Weatherly died when he lost control entering Turn 6, hitting the steel barrier almost broadside and had his head snapped out the window against the barrier.

Nevertheless, in 1983 Turn 9 was the site of the only fatality in IMSA GTP history. In the 1983 Times Grand Prix, Rolf Stommelen's Joest-constructed Porsche 935 lost its rear wing at the Dogleg and hit two freeway-type barriers sending it into a horrific roll at Turn 9.

Of the entire road course races run at RIR, there was one that was run in a counter-clockwise direction, sometime around 1960. In 1966 Dan Gurney tested his first Eagle racing car on a shorter, counter-clockwise version of the track tailored specifically for his car's Indianapolis-specific left-turn oiling system. The test caused Gurney to ask track president Les Richter to hold an Indianapolis-style race there. From 1967 to 1969 the Rex Mays 300 served as the season-ending USAC Indianapolis-car race.

ESPN was live for the June 12, 1988, Budweiser 400 race at RIR and caught racer Ruben Garcia crashing hard off turn 9 and his car went through a tire/guardrail barrier and then goes through the fence, destroys a cement barrier before coming to rest near a fence where the fans were sitting on the 32nd lap. He was not injured, though, and neither were the race fans, the red flag was out for 25 minutes and 5 seconds to make repairs to the area by adding 2 Jersey barriers.

After 14 years of NASCAR as a driver and later a car owner, Richard Childress won his first NASCAR race in 1983, when Ricky Rudd drove his #3 Piedmont Airlines Chevrolet to victory in the 1983 Budweiser 400k.

From 1981 until 1987, NASCAR's championship race was at Riverside.  The USAC Championship Trail also held their season ending race from 1967 to 1969.  Riverside was also home to track announcer Sandy Reed and (along with former LA Rams player Les Richter) Roy Hord Jr.  Both NASCAR team owners Roger Penske and Rick Hendrick drove a select few races at Riverside in their own cars, Penske won a Winston West race in 1963, while in the final race in 1988, Hendrick got out of the car and let Elliott Forbes-Robinson take over.

The Winston Western 500 came to be known as the signature event at the track.  Initially (1963-1981) this race was held in January as the season opener, but beginning in 1982 NASCAR elected to start the season with the Daytona 500. From 1981 to 1987 the Winston Western 500 was held in November as the final race of the season. As of 2021, 1981 is the only year in NASCAR history that Riverside held 3 Cup Series events in a single season (the season opener, the season's halfway point, and the season finale). The reason why Riverside was the season finale for 1981 was because Ontario Motor Speedway closed after their season ended in 1980.

Riverside also hosted drag racing events, between 1961 and 1969, the Hot Rod Magazine Championship Drag Races, "one of the most significant drag racing events" of that era, were held at RIR. The championship offered a US$37,000 prize, greater even than a NHRA national event prize at the time.

Carroll Shelby and Skip Barber had racing schools at Riverside to teach students on how to drive around the racetrack and show them the preferred line on how to enter and exit a corner, Barber was the last racing school to be at Riverside when it was closed in 1989.

The Four Courses of Riverside
The track was built to accommodate several different configurations, depending on the series and race length. The three options on Riverside Raceway were the long course, the short course, and the NASCAR course. The original racetrack had a  backstretch from 1957 to 1968. When the track was redesigned in 1969 (it had to close for a water relocation project), turn 9 was reconfigured with a wider radius and banked with a dogleg approach added, to reduce strain on the car's brakes. The fourth track configuration was a drag racing strip.

Before any racing event at RIR, track crews added traffic pylons to close off sections of the track. The closed sections were determined by the specific course and cars used during any given race.

Throughout its history, various other track configurations were used to adapt the track for events such as off-road, Cal-Club and motorcycle events.

Diagram notes: The long course had the  backstretch between turns 8 & 9. This version was used primarily for the Los Angeles Times Grand Prix, although the long course was also used for Indy car racing in the mid-1980s.  When the 1969 version was built, the dogleg was added so as to ease the transition into Turn 9 (the track had seen numerous brake failure-induced accidents approaching turn 9, and this change was made as a safety measure). In the short course, the track would use turn 7A rather than 8. The "turn 7-7A" configuration effectively shortened the back straight to just over one-half mile in length. The NHRA drag strip ran south to north on the backstretch from the runoff to the Bosch Bridge (not shown in diagram), which crossed over the track about halfway between turns 8 & 9.

Movies and television
Due to its proximity to the Southern California entertainment industry, RIR was a frequent filming location for Hollywood movies, television series and commercials.

Scenes from the television shows CHiPs (used as both a stand in for Phoenix International Raceway and Riverside itself for the episode Drive, Lady, Drive), Simon and Simon, The Rockford Files, The Fall Guy, The F.B.I., Hardcastle & McCormick, Knight Rider, Quincy, M.E., and the HBO program Super Dave Osborne were shot on location at RIR. The television movie adaptation of Gemini Man, Riding With Death, featured as an experiment on the television show Mystery Science Theater 3000, also contains footage of racing at Riverside.

RIR was extensively featured in the 1961 telefilm "The Quick and the Dead," an episode of the series Route 66. The episode stars Martin Milner and George Maharis, and guest stars Harvey Korman, Regis Toomey, and Betsy Jones-Moreland. Milner races a 1960 powder-blue Chevrolet Corvette in the film.

A 1963 Plymouth-sponsored film called Return to Riverside was shot at RIR from November 26–29, 1962.  The film highlighted various road tests between 1963 Plymouth, Chevrolet, and Ford passenger cars.  It featured race car drivers Leroy Neumayer, Clem Proctor, and Roger McCluskey.  The film was hosted by Sid Collins, the radio voice of the Indianapolis 500.

Film shoots at RIR included scenes from:  Good Guys Wear Black (1978) The Betsy (1978), Fireball 500 (1966), Grand Prix (1966), The Killers (1964),  The Love Bug (1968), On the Beach (1959), Roadracers (1959), Speedway (1968), Stacey (1973), Thunder Alley (1967), Winning (1969), and Viva Las Vegas (1964).

Use in gaming
The track was used in Sierra Entertainment's NASCAR Legends, NASCAR Heat and later was converted to NASCAR 4, NASCAR Racing 2002 Season, 2003 and rFactor.

Riverside has also been featured in Indianapolis 500: Evolution for the Xbox 360 and can be downloaded into rFactor with all 3 options.

Closure and transformation into a shopping mall

RIR, headed by former Los Angeles Rams player Les Richter, sold the property to real estate developer Fritz Duda in 1971 after American Raceways Inc. (which also owned Texas World Speedway, Atlanta International Raceway, Michigan International Speedway and Trenton Speedway) declared bankruptcy. Duda had once been a turn announcer for NASCAR's broadcasting arm Motor Racing Network plus the raceway's radio network (along with Ralph Lawler) and many felt racing would long be a part of the Riverside landscape.

During this time, Riverside County and the newly incorporated Moreno Valley area had a growth spurt; new residents started enclosing in on the raceway and became hostile about the raceway's noise levels but, furthermore, the land the raceway was on was becoming more and more valuable such that the track was almost able to survive. However, with protests from both residents and environmentalists, Riverside's continued existence was impossible. (During this time, track president Dan Greenwood, who succeeded Richter in 1983, was trying to search for Riverside's replacement, Perris and Corona.)

1988 was the final year of professional racing for Riverside. On June 12, 1988, NASCAR held its final Winston Cup race at RIR; the 1988 Budweiser 400 was won by Rusty Wallace (a caution flag, later red flag,  was out for Ruben Garcia when he came off Turn 9 and lost control of his car and hit a wall, barely missing the grandstands, on lap 29), later on SCORE International held its last race on August 14, 1988. In 1989, the track was modified from turn 7 to near the dogleg after a section of the backstretch and turn 7A near the Bosh Bridge was severed for Towngate Blvd. and Eucalyptus Ave., the modified track was called Riverside Regional Raceway and continued to be used for club events. After 31 years of racing, Riverside closed on July 2, 1989, with the final Cal-Club event (which, ironically, ended the way it started with the death of racer Mark Verbofsky on July 1, 1989).

Duda (along with Homart Development Company) turned the "House that Dan Gurney built" (which had him quoting in an episode in SpeedWeek "I'm glad to see it gone") into a shopping mall which opened in 1992. The Moreno Valley Mall at Towngate is on the northern end of the former raceway property and homes now occupy what was the southern end of the racetrack. In a 1994 aerial view of RIR, the remains of Riverside's Turn 9, the original backstretch, the 1969 aligned backstretch from the kink to the entrance to Turn 9, part of the pit entrance and front stretch wall were still visible along with the Administration Building.  However, today nothing is left of RIR except for memorabilia from the racetrack. The old Administration Building remained until 2005, when it was torn down to make way for a complex of townhouses.

Numerous streets in the neighborhood to the east of the Moreno Valley Mall off Frederick Street are named after racers that raced at Riverside, such as Yarborough Drive, Gurney Place, Donohue Court, Surtees Court, Brabham Street, Andretti Street and Penske Street.

When Riverside closed in 1989, it followed in the footsteps of Ontario Motor Speedway (in nearby Ontario), which closed in 1980, and was followed by Ascot Park in Gardena in 1991.  In the 1990s, two new circuits opened: Auto Club Speedway in nearby Fontana in 1997, and Toyota Speedway at Irwindale (now the Irwindale Event Center) in 1999 and is in danger of meeting the same fate as Riverside. Both tracks, like Riverside, have been used for filming.

In 2003, the remainder of the old Riverside International Raceway was torn up. The sign that was at State Route 60 and Day Street was removed to make way for both a Lowe's warehouse and a new pair of on/off ramps and Turn 9 of the old track is now home to houses.

In 2003, plans were announced to build a  road course with a similar design to the famed Riverside layout in Merced, California. The track would have been known as the Riverside Motorsports Park, but the project was abandoned in 2009.

Race lap records

The fastest official all-time track record set during a race weekend is 1:10.050, set by Elliot Forbes-Robinson in a Nissan GTP ZX-T during qualifying for the 1987 Los Angeles Times Grand Prix. The fastest official race lap records at Riverside International Raceway for different classes are listed as:

Fatalities at Riverside
From September 21, 1957, to July 2, 1989, 21 people died (19 drivers, 1 spectator and 1 pit crew member) in the track's 31-year history:

 John Lawrence (Sept. 21, 1957)
 Pedro van Dory (April 3, 1960)
 Bruce Johnston (Aug. 21, 1961)
 Pete Hessler (March 11, 1962)
 Pat Pigott (Oct. 14, 1962)
 Stuart Dane (Feb. 2, 1963)
 Joe Weatherly (Jan. 19, 1964)
 George Koehne Jr. (Oct. 11, 1964)
 Jim Ladd (Nov. 15, 1964)
 Ronald Pickle (spectator) (Jan. 17, 1965)
 Ken Miles (Aug. 17, 1966)
 Billy Foster (Jan. 20, 1967)
 Vic Tandy (Jan. 27, 1968)
 Mel Andrus (April 25, 1971)
 Bill Spencer (Jan. 18, 1975)
 Lynwood "Sonny" Easley and Douglas Grunst (pit crewman) (Jan. 15, 1978)
 Tim Williamson (Jan. 12, 1980)
 Rolf Stommelen (April 24, 1983)
 John Goss (Oct. 17, 1983)
 Mark Verbofsky (July 1, 1989)

Races held at Riverside International Raceway

NASCAR Winston Cup Series and Winston West combined races:
 Motor Trend 500 / Winston Western 500 (1958, 1961, 1964–1987)
 Budweiser 400 (1963, 1970–1988)
USAC Championship Trail (Indycar) Rex Mays 300 (1967–1969)
PPG Indy Car World Series: AirCal 500 / L.A. Times 500 / Budweiser 500K (1981–1983)
Los Angeles Times Grand Prix of Endurance
AMA Superbike Championship (1976–1977, 1982–1984)
Formula One: 1960 United States Grand Prix
(Unofficial) 24 hours of Riverside, testing the Chevy Corvair
The first IROC race was held in October 1973, and the track hosted IROC races intermittently through its lifespan.
NHRA drag racing in the mid sixties.
SCORE International Off Road World Championships, the last one was held in August 1988.
IMSA Car races
(SCCA) Regional & National amateur races, and professional (Trans-Am, Can-Am Series) car races
Rex Mays 300
AMA motorcycle racing
United States Road Race Championship (USRRC) SCCA series for professional racing drivers 1963-1968 (RIR 1964–1965)
Riverside Olympic Relay held on July 19, 1964

See also
 Motorsport Arena Oschersleben, a current German racing circuit with a similar but smaller (3.67 km/2.29 mi) layout
 Riverside International Automotive Museum

References

Further reading
Riverside Raceway, Palace Of Speed by Dick Wallen
Riverside International Raceway by Pete Lyons
 Motorsport Memorial entry on Rolf Stommelen (2005), motorsportmemorial.org. Retrieved February 1, 2005.
 Motorsport Memorial entry on Billy Foster (1966), motorsportmemorial.org
 Articles about Riverside Int'l Raceway:

External links

Riverside International Automotive Museum (Now Closed)
Riverside International Automotive Museum's Annual Film Festival & Gala 
Riverside International Raceway's Picture Pages from Frank Sheffield, a former RIR corner worker
NASCAR track history

Motorsport venues in California
Defunct drag racing venues
Defunct motorsport venues in the United States
Defunct sports venues in California
Buildings and structures in Riverside, California
Sports venues in Riverside, California
Sports venues completed in 1957
1957 establishments in California
1989 disestablishments in California
Defunct companies based in Greater Los Angeles
Champ Car circuits
Formula One circuits
NASCAR tracks
International Race of Champions tracks
NASCAR races at Riverside International Raceway
IMSA GT Championship circuits
United States Grand Prix
Demolished sports venues in California
Sports venues in the Inland Empire